Ruessei Krang is a khum (commune) of Moung Ruessei District in Battambang Province in north-western Cambodia.

Villages

 Neak Ta Tvear
 Yeun Mean
 Tuol Snuol
 Chrey Run
 Tuol Roka
 Nikom Kraom
 Srah Chineang
 Pech Changvar
 Ampil Chhung
 Thnal Bat

References

Communes of Battambang province
Moung Ruessei District